Townsend is a town in New Castle County, Delaware, United States. The population was 2,049 at the 2010 census, an increase of 492.2% from 2000.  The center of population of Delaware is located in Townsend.

Geography
Townsend is located at  (39.3951115, –75.6915973).

History
Townsend was incorporated as a town on April 3, 1885. Its primary business was selling agricultural produce via the Delaware Railroad. The railroad has since lost prominence over freight hauling, but the town still remains primarily agricultural with plenty of rural area and local produce.

The name, Townsend, comes from a prominent businessman and Delaware Democrat, Samuel John Townsend. Prior to 1885, the town was known as Charley Town. Between 1845 and 1855 brothers Samuel and John Townsend purchased several large tracts of farmland in the vicinity. The Delaware Railroad arrived here in 1856, bisecting Samuel Townsend's property. This led to a period of sustained growth for the town, as the railroad station became the principal shipping point for the area's agricultural products. In September 1856 the Post Office was established, and the first hotel opened in 1857. Following a healthy debate among the residents, the station was named Townsend, after the area's major land owners. The peach industry was a vital contributor to the area's growth and prosperity until disease destroyed many Delmarva orchards in the late 19th century. A free African American community was located here by the mid-19th century.

The town has since created a "Comprehensive Development Plan", as required by state law February 2003, for land preservation.

The Townsend Historic District, which includes 216 buildings, was listed on the National Register of Historic Places in 1986.

Mayors of the town
Note: List of Mayors is incomplete. Please add cited sources to complete this list.

0000? - 2007 Charles Murry (Town Records)
 2007(?)-2009 - Dave Raughley
 2010–2011: John Hanlin
 2012: Steve High
 2013: Joel Esler
 2014-2015: Jermaine Hatton
 2016-2019: Rudy Sutton
 2019–2021: Tom McDonald
 2021-2022:  Patrick Miller
 Current: Scott Lobdell, P.E.

Infrastructure

Transportation

Delaware Route 71 runs northwest-southeast through the eastern part of Townsend and heads northwest to Middletown and southeast to an intersection with U.S. Route 13. Main Street serves as the main east-west road through Townsend. DART First State provides bus service to Townsend along Route 302, which heads north to Middletown and Newark and south to Smyrna and Dover. Townsend is located at the junction between the Delmarva Central Railroad's Delmarva Subdivision and the Maryland and Delaware Railroad's Northern Line.

Utilities
Delmarva Power, a subsidiary of Exelon, provides electricity to Townsend. Chesapeake Utilities provides natural gas to the town. Artesian Water Company, a subsidiary of Artesian Resources, provides water to Townsend. Trash and recycling collection in Townsend is provided by Waste Industries.

Education
Townsend is within the Appoquinimink School District. Odessa High School has a Townsend postal address.

MOT Charter School is an area charter school.

Demographics

At the 2000 census there were 346 people, 132 households, and 95 families living in the town. The racial makeup of the town was 84.10% White, 11.56% African American, 0.87% Native American, 0.87% Asian, 2.60% from other races. Hispanic or Latino of any race were 2.60%.

Of the 132 households 36.4% had children under the age of 18 living with them, 59.1% were married couples living together, 9.8% had a female householder with no husband present, and 28.0% were non-families. 20.5% of households were one person and 7.6% were one person aged 65 or older. The average household size was 2.62 and the average family size was 3.06.

The age distribution was 26.9% under the age of 18, 7.8% from 18 to 24, 32.1% from 25 to 44, 20.5% from 45 to 64, and 12.7% 65 or older. The median age was 36 years. For every 100 females, there were 92.2 males. For every 100 females age 18 and over, there were 88.8 males.

The median household income was $47,500 and the median family income  was $48,875. Males had a median income of $27,250 versus $28,409 for females. The per capita income for the town was $17,671. About 2.1% of families and 1.7% of the population were below the poverty line, including none of those under age 18 and 8.7% of those age 65 or over.

Notable people
Samuel John Townsend (1812–1881), businessman and prominent Democrat, for which the town was named after. Townsend was a vibrant Delaware Democrat, working as a ship captain, timber producer, and finally, a peach farmer who exported canned peaches to New York from Delaware and Maryland.
David P. Buckson (1920–2017), Governor of Delaware, was born in Townsend
Dominique McLean, aka SonicFox, professional esports player and recipient of "Gamer of the Year" Award at The Game Awards 2018

References

Towns in New Castle County, Delaware
Towns in Delaware